Dimorphocarpa is a genus of flowering plants belonging to the family Brassicaceae.

Its native range is Western and Central USA to Northern Mexico.

Species:

Dimorphocarpa candicans 
Dimorphocarpa membranacea 
Dimorphocarpa pinnatifida 
Dimorphocarpa wislizeni

References

Brassicaceae
Brassicaceae genera